Gwyneth Barber Wood (died 2006) was a Jamaican travel agent and writer.

Biography
She was born in Kingston, Jamaica. In 2000, she received a bronze medal and merit certificate for two poems from the Jamaica Cultural Development Commission Literary Awards. Wood was a fellow of the Virginia Center for the Creative Arts in 2001 and 2003. She was invited to read at the Calabash International Literary Festival in 2001. Her poetry has appeared in Artemis journal, The Jamaica Observer, The Caribbean Writer and the anthology series Bearing Witness. Her first poetry collection, The Garden of Forgetting, was published in 2005.

References 

Year of birth missing
2006 deaths
20th-century Jamaican poets
21st-century Jamaican poets
Jamaican women poets
People from Kingston, Jamaica
20th-century Jamaican women writers
21st-century Jamaican women writers